Tattenham Corner railway station is in Surrey, in England. The station and all trains serving it are operated by Southern, and it is the terminus of the Tattenham Corner Line.

It lies on the outskirts of Epsom and is the closest station for Epsom Downs Racecourse, where the Derby is held and the British monarch traditionally alights from the British Royal Train in those years when attending the Derby.  The line serving it was opened (as the Chipstead Valley Railway) in stages between 1897 and 1901, with the commissioning of the final section coinciding with the opening of the station on 4 June that year (by which time the SER had absorbed the independent company). The station closed in September 1914 and was used occasionally for race specials from 1920 until full public service restored (upon electrification) on 25 March 1928. In its heyday, the station had seven platforms (to handle the sizeable amounts of racecourse traffic) but today only three remain.

Epsom Downs station is nearby as the terminus of the Epsom Downs branch line from Sutton, also served by Southern services.

Accidents and incidents 
On 1 December 1993, an approaching train (the 06.16 from Victoria) failed to brake in time to stop in the platform and overran the buffer stops; the leading vehicle ended up mounting the concourse and becoming embedded in the wooden station booking office (which subsequently had to be demolished).  No passengers were injured in the crash, though the train driver and a member of station staff were hospitalised.  The driver was later found to be intoxicated on duty and jailed for nine months.

Services 
All services at Tattenham Corner are operated by Southern using  EMUs.

Passengers for London Bridge have to change at Purley.

It was initially proposed that from 2018, when the Thameslink Programme is completed, services on this line would be operated with larger 12 car trains offering all day direct services to  via . However, in September 2016, these proposals were dropped; instead, services on the Tattenham Corner Line were to "remain as Southern South London Metro services with increased capacity as compared to today".

References

External links 

Railway stations in Surrey
Transport in Epsom and Ewell
Former South Eastern Railway (UK) stations
Railway stations in Great Britain opened in 1901
Railway stations in Great Britain closed in 1914
Railway stations in Great Britain opened in 1928
Railway stations served by Govia Thameslink Railway
Epsom Downs Racecourse